Ockley is an unincorporated community in Madison Township, Carroll County, in the U.S. state of Indiana.

The community is part of the Lafayette, Indiana Metropolitan Statistical Area.

History
A post office was established at Ockley in 1884, and remained in operation until it was discontinued in 1976. The origin of the name Ockley is obscure, but it could possibly be of Native American origin.

Geography

References

External links

Unincorporated communities in Carroll County, Indiana
Unincorporated communities in Indiana
Lafayette metropolitan area, Indiana